is a passenger railway station located in the town of Ayagawa, Kagawa, Japan.  It is operated by the private transportation company Takamatsu-Kotohira Electric Railroad (Kotoden) and is designated station "K15".

Lines
Takinomiya Station is a station on the Kotoden Kotohira Line and is located 20.7 km from the opposing terminus of the line at Takamatsu-Chikkō Station. Takinomiya is the terminus for some services from Takamatsu-Chikkō Station.

Layout
The station consists of one side platform and one island platform connected by a level crossing. It is the only staffed station on the Kotohira Line outside of Takamatsu City. The station building has been in use since the opening of the line in 1926, and has been certified as a modern industrial heritage.

Adjacent stations

History
Takinomiya Station opened on December 21, 1926 as a station of the Kotohira Electric Railway. On November 1, 1943 it became  a station on the Takamatsu Kotohira Electric Railway Kotohira Line due to a company merger.

Surrounding area
Takinomiya Tenman-gu Shrine
Ayagawa Town Hall
Japan National Route 32

Passenger statistics

Gallery

See also
 List of railway stations in Japan

References

External links

  

Railway stations in Japan opened in 1926
Railway stations in Kagawa Prefecture
Ayagawa, Kagawa